Statistics of Swedish football Division 2 for the 1945–46 season.

League standings

Division 2 Norra 1945–46 
Teams from a large part of northern Sweden, approximately above the province of Medelpad, were not allowed to play in the national league system until the 1953–54 season.

Division 2 Östra 1945–46

Division 2 Västra 1945–46

Division 2 Södra 1945–46

References
Sweden - List of final tables (Clas Glenning)

Swedish Football Division 2 seasons
2
Sweden